Cratichneumon is a genus of the parasitic wasp family Ichneumonidae.

Species
Species within this genus include:

 Cratichneumon ablutus
 Cratichneumon acronictae
 Cratichneumon albifrons
 Cratichneumon albiscuta
 Cratichneumon alternans
 Cratichneumon amamioshimensis
 Cratichneumon amecus
 Cratichneumon amoenus
 Cratichneumon anisotae
 Cratichneumon annulatipes
 Cratichneumon annulatus
 Cratichneumon anotylus
 Cratichneumon argemus
 Cratichneumon arizonensis
 Cratichneumon armillatops
 Cratichneumon ashmeadi
 Cratichneumon aspratilis
 Cratichneumon astutus
 Cratichneumon austropiceipes
 Cratichneumon bifasciatus
 Cratichneumon boreoalpinus
 Cratichneumon boreovagans
 Cratichneumon brevipennis
 Cratichneumon broweri
 Cratichneumon carolinae
 Cratichneumon causticus
 Cratichneumon chishimanus
 Cratichneumon citrinus
 Cratichneumon coruscator
 Cratichneumon culex
 Cratichneumon davisi
 Cratichneumon declinans
 Cratichneumon demissus
 Cratichneumon dissimilis
 Cratichneumon doliturus
 Cratichneumon duplicatus
 Cratichneumon erythroscuta
 Cratichneumon excors
 Cratichneumon fabricator
 Cratichneumon facetus
 Cratichneumon ferrugops
 Cratichneumon flaschkai
 Cratichneumon flavifrons
 Cratichneumon flavipectus
 Cratichneumon flavomaculatus
 Cratichneumon floridensis
 Cratichneumon fugitivus
 Cratichneumon georgius
 Cratichneumon hongawaensis
 Cratichneumon horani
 Cratichneumon howdeni
 Cratichneumon infidus
 Cratichneumon insignitus
 Cratichneumon insolitus
 Cratichneumon insulae
 Cratichneumon interfector
 Cratichneumon involutus
 Cratichneumon japonicus
 Cratichneumon jocularis
 Cratichneumon jozanensis
 Cratichneumon kochiensis
 Cratichneumon labiatus
 Cratichneumon laevidorsis
 Cratichneumon lancea
 Cratichneumon leptocerus
 Cratichneumon lesnei
 Cratichneumon levis
 Cratichneumon louisianae
 Cratichneumon luteiventris
 Cratichneumon melanosomus
 Cratichneumon merucapitis
 Cratichneumon naumanni
 Cratichneumon nikkoensis
 Cratichneumon okamotoi
 Cratichneumon orientalis
 Cratichneumon pallitarsis
 Cratichneumon papilionariae
 Cratichneumon paraparatus
 Cratichneumon parata
 Cratichneumon parvulus
 Cratichneumon pectoralis
 Cratichneumon pertenuis
 Cratichneumon petulcus
 Cratichneumon piceipes
 Cratichneumon pigeoti
 Cratichneumon pilosulus
 Cratichneumon popofensis
 Cratichneumon pratincola
 Cratichneumon promptus
 Cratichneumon proximus
 Cratichneumon pseudanisotae
 Cratichneumon pteridis
 Cratichneumon pulcherrimus
 Cratichneumon puncticoxa
 Cratichneumon pygmaeus
 Cratichneumon remanens
 Cratichneumon ritus
 Cratichneumon rubricoides
 Cratichneumon rubricops
 Cratichneumon rubricus
 Cratichneumon rufifrons
 Cratichneumon rufomaculatus
 Cratichneumon russatus
 Cratichneumon sahlbergi
 Cratichneumon sanguineoplagiatus
 Cratichneumon scitulus
 Cratichneumon semirufus
 Cratichneumon sexarmillatus
 Cratichneumon sicarius
 Cratichneumon signatipes
 Cratichneumon spilomerus
 Cratichneumon stenocarus
 Cratichneumon suadus
 Cratichneumon subfilatus
 Cratichneumon sublatus
 Cratichneumon takomae
 Cratichneumon tibialis
 Cratichneumon tyloidifer
 Cratichneumon unifasciatorius
 Cratichneumon unificatus
 Cratichneumon vaccinii
 Cratichneumon w-album
 Cratichneumon variegatus
 Cratichneumon veraepacis
 Cratichneumon versator
 Cratichneumon vescus
 Cratichneumon viator
 Cratichneumon vinnulus
 Cratichneumon vockerothi
 Cratichneumon vulpecula
 Cratichneumon yakutatensis

References

Ichneumonidae genera
Ichneumoninae